Mark Moreton Parker (2 October 1975 – 12 October 2002) was a New Zealand cricketer.  He played three matches of first-class cricket for the Otago Volts in the 1996-97, and he also played for South Canterbury in the Hawke Cup. 

Born in Timaru on New Zealand's South Island, Parker was the son of New Zealand cricketer Murray Parker and nephew of John Parker.  He scored 50 first-class runs with a top score of 14.  He captained New Zealand at Under-20 level and was described by test player Gavin Larsen, as "mega-talented... a great timer of the ball and should have played more first-class cricket".  

Parker died in Bali of wounds received in the 2002 Bali bombings, carried out by Jemaah Islamiyah, an Indonesian Islamist terrorist group.   He had played in England for Hampshire club St Cross Symondians and was holidaying in Bali at the time of his death, having celebrated his 27th birthday, before taking up a club position in New Zealand.

See also
 List of Otago representative cricketers

References
Article on memorial weekend
Cricinfo

1975 births
2002 deaths
New Zealand cricketers
Otago cricketers
Cricketers from Timaru
New Zealand terrorism victims
New Zealand people murdered abroad
People murdered in Indonesia
2002 Bali bombings
New Zealand expatriate sportspeople in England